Miky Maous is a Greek weekly comic that was first published on 1 July 1966, by Christos Terzopoulos. In 2006, the magazine surpassed 2000 issues and forty years of consecutive weekly print. It was the second oldest comic title in Greece until it ceased publication in 2013.

Miky Maous was published by Nea Aktina A. E., a subsidiary of Terzopoulos Publishing S. A. and Lambrakis Press Group since 1999. At the beginning of September 2013, Miky Maous ceased publications due to the ongoing crisis in Greece, that caused budget problems to Nea Aktina.

In 2014, the magazine was relaunched by Kathimerini, with a new numbering starting again from #1.

In Greek culture, the phrase Miky Maous has become synonymous with comic books as almost every Greek has been a Disney magazine reader at some point in his or her life.

External links
 - Original publication
 - New publication
Disney Comics Worldwide

1966 establishments in Greece
2013 disestablishments in Greece
Defunct magazines published in Greece
Disney comics titles
Greek-language magazines
Magazines established in 1966
Magazines disestablished in 2013
Magazines about comics
Mickey Mouse comics
Weekly magazines